This is a list of '''Tennessee Tech Golden Eagles football players in the NFL Draft.

Key

Selections
Source:

References

Tennessee Tech

Tennessee Tech Golden Eagles NFL Draft